Lycoperdon mammiforme is a  rare, inedible type of puffball mushroom in the genus Lycoperdon, found in deciduous forest on chalk soil. It is found in Europe.

References

External links

Fungi of Europe
Puffballs
Fungi described in 1801
Taxa named by Christiaan Hendrik Persoon
mammiforme